Neil Robert Stuke (born 22 February 1966 in Deal, Kent) is an English actor best known for his role of Matthew in the TV sitcom Game On and more recently for playing Billy Lamb in the BBC legal drama Silk.

Career
Stuke played Matthew in the second and third series of Game On, replacing Ben Chaplin. He also played the role of Senior Clerk Billy Lamb in the BBC television series Silk. His television career also includes Between the Lines, Trust, Reggie Perrin, At Home with the Braithwaites, Monday Monday, Office Gossip, Bedtime, A Touch of Frost, The Catherine Tate Show and playing an alcoholic footballer/policeman in a 1997 episode of Pie in the Sky.

In 2006, he guest-starred in The Bill; his character (James Tennant) was involved in the storyline of missing child Amy Tennant.

In the summer of 2010, Stuke was featured on Celebrity MasterChef, where it was discovered that he was not a very good chef, despite his claim that he was. He has also been a panellist on several episodes of the topical discussion series The Wright Stuff. 

In August 2014, Stuke was one of 200 public figures who were signatories to a letter to The Guardian opposing Scottish independence in the run-up to September's referendum on that issue.

In January 2020, he appeared in an episode of Doctor Who, alongside Jodie Whittaker, Jo Martin and The Judoon.

Filmography

References

External links
Neil Stuke Official Website

Rookery Nook website

1966 births
English male stage actors
English male television actors
Living people
Male actors from Kent
People from Deal, Kent
20th-century English male actors
21st-century English male actors